CHK may refer to:
 CHK (TV channel), a television channel in Southeast Asia
 Chesapeake Energy, a major producer of natural gas
 Civil Hospital Karachi, Pakistan
 Chiswick railway station, England
 Christian Historical Voters' League
 Chuukese language
 .CHK, a filename extension used by the CHKDSK program
 Checksum
 Cheka (ЧК), Extraordinary Commission, Soviet secret police from 1917 till 1922